The Grammy Award for Best Engineered Recording can mean:
The Grammy Award for Best Engineered Recording, Non-Classical.
The Grammy Award for Best Classical Engineered Recording.